Irlam is a town in the City of Salford Metropolitan Borough, Greater Manchester, England.  The town and the area of Cadishead contain three listed buildings that are recorded in the National Heritage List for England.  All the listed buildings are designated at Grade II, the lowest of the three grades, which is applied to "buildings of national importance and special interest". They consist of two 17th-century houses and a war memorial.
 

Buildings

References

Citations

Sources

Lists of listed buildings in Greater Manchester
Buildings and structures in the City of Salford